"Bump n' Grind" is a song written, produced, and performed by American singer-songwriter R. Kelly. It was released on January 28, 1994, as the second single from his debut solo studio album, 12 Play (1993). The track became a number one single on the US Billboard Hot 100 (temporarily interrupting the six-week run of Ace of Base's "The Sign"), and it also spent twelve weeks at number one on the US Hot R&B Songs chart as Kelly's third number-one R&B hit, becoming the longest-running number-one of 1994 in the US, and the longest-running R&B single at that time. The song also reached number eight on the UK Singles Chart, following the massive success of his previous single, "She's Got That Vibe" (which was actually a re-release).

Kelly released three versions of "Bump n' Grind": the original album version and two remixes. The original LP version was made available for airplay on urban and Top 40 pop radio stations alike at first, but eventually the "Old School" remix was issued shortly and gained massive airplay on urban, adult R&B/soul and rhythmic radio stations. Kelly also released the "Bump n' Grind (How I Feel It Extended Mix)", which was used in the original video for the song. This version received major play on urban radio as well. Some stations still played the original version until Kelly's music largely vanished from playlists leading up to and following his conviction.

Critical reception
Martin Johnson from Chicago Reader wrote, "On the album’s second single, "Bump n’ Grind", which caught everyone but Kelly off guard by becoming one of the biggest R&B hits of all time, he sings mostly about lust; his idea of subtlety is anguished longing, and he cradles his earthy melismata in soft, billowy backgrounds. It’s as if he sought to combine the tormented craving of Marvin Gaye’s "Let’s Get It On" with the sultry cool of Sade’s "Nothing Can Come Between Us"." In his weekly UK chart commentary, James Masterton felt that it's "a rather slower track but certain to be boosted by his imminent arrival on these shores for a series of concerts in career boosting move that echoes the rise of Bobby Brown here in 1989." Ralph Tee from Music Weeks RM Dance Update wrote, "Less instant than "Sex Me" but now a firm favourite from the album, R Kelly and associates beef up this raunchy ballad with extra bass drum and snare kick for a superb slow jam. Kelly also gives himself an opportunity to stretch out vocally on the tune, showcasing some impressive technique atop the infectious background harmonies. Already large in R&B circles and from an album that sounds better with every spin." Another editor, James Hamilton, described it as a "moaning 'I don't see nothin' wrong' 65bpm groin grinder".

Music video
The accompanying music video for "Bump n' Grind" did not feature the famous intro. It was filmed like a live concert performance and was directed by Kim Watson.

Live performances
Kelly always performed the intro of the song at almost all events he performed in; he usually performed the "Bump N' Grind (Remix)" instead of the original at concert, despite the original single's huge success. Kelly performed the remix versions of the song on various shows in 1994, on The Arsenio Hall Show, Billboard Music Award and Soul Train.

Charts

Weekly charts

Year-end charts

Decade-end charts

Certifications

Release history

Legacy
Uses in popular culture
 The song is used in numerous films such as Without a Paddle, American Reunion, Project X, The Wackness and Grimsby.
 The song is in the video game Grand Theft Auto IV on the radio station The Vibe 98.8.
 The song has been used in the British comedy series Gavin & Stacey, ABC Series Super Fun Night and the American adult animated sitcom American Dad!.
 Artists like Bruno Mars, B. Smyth, Bobby V, Adrian Marcel and Chris Brown have covered this song live.
 In 2013 a video went viral on social media showing an old man singing this song in his backyard.

Later samples
 "I'll Take Her" (Ill Al Scratch featuring Brian McKnight)
 "Body Bumpin' (Yippie-Yi-Yo) Remix" (Public Announcement)
 "Rodeo" (Juvenile) (samples: "Bump n' Grind (Old School Remix)")
 "Karate Chop Remix" (Future featuring Lil Wayne)
 "Songs on 12 Play" (Chris Brown featuring Trey Songz)

"Bump & Grind 2014"

British house duo Waze & Odyssey produced a bootleg of the track in 2012, sampling "Push the Feeling On" by Nightcrawlers. The remix was officially released on October 19, 2014.

Background
"Bump & Grind 2014" was produced by the duo Serge Santiágo and Firas Waez, also known as Waze & Odyssey. The record started as an underground hit in 2012, more DJs were playing the song at clubs as time went on. But it was not until 2014 it got a major release from their label RCA and started getting airplay. At the time it was an underground favorite among famous British DJs like Skream, DJ EZ, Duke Dumont, Rudimental were playing it at clubs.

Music video
The music video was released two months before the actual official release of the song. The video features Hok from the American hip hop group Quest Crew as the main person.

Formats and track listings
 Digital download "Bump & Grind 2014" – 3:00

 Digital remixes EP'
 "Bump & Grind 2014" (Extended Mix) – 7:23
 "Bump & Grind 2014" (Special Request VIP) – 8:34
 "Bump & Grind 2014" (Le Youth Remix) – 4:01

Charts

Certifications

See also
 List of Billboard Hot 100 number-one singles of 1994
 List of number-one R&B singles of 1994 (U.S.)

References

1990s ballads
1994 singles
1994 songs
2014 singles
Billboard Hot 100 number-one singles
Contemporary R&B ballads
Jive Records singles
R. Kelly songs
Song recordings produced by R. Kelly
Songs written by R. Kelly